James City is an unincorporated area and census-designated place (CDP) in Craven County, North Carolina, United States. The population was 5,899 at the 2010 census. It is part of the New Bern, North Carolina Metropolitan Statistical Area.

History
James City was developed during the American Civil War when Union forces, occupying nearby New Bern, constructed a resettlement camp for freed slaves on land belonging to Confederate Army Colonel Peter G. Evans. Originally referred to as the Trent River Settlement, by 1865 it had been renamed James City, after its founder, Union Army chaplain Horace James, superintendent of Negro affairs and agent for the Bureau of Freedmen, Refugees, and Abandoned Lands.

Geography

James City is located in central Craven County at  (35.075400, -77.026631), along the west bank of the tidal Neuse River. It is bordered to the north by the city of New Bern, the county seat, across the Trent River, a tributary of the Neuse. To the west are the unincorporated community of Brices Creek, and a more recently annexed portion of New Bern. Coastal Carolina Regional Airport is in the northwestern part of the CDP.

Demographics

2020 census

As of the 2020 United States census, there were 5,291 people, 2,144 households, and 1,475 families residing in the CDP.

2000 census
As of the census of 2000, there were 5,420 people, 2,184 households, and 1,530 families residing in the CDP. The population density was 651.5 people per square mile (251.5/km2). There were 2,397 housing units at an average density of 288.1 per square mile (111.2/km2). The racial makeup of the CDP was 78.91% White, 18.14% African American, 0.24% Native American, 0.48% Asian, 0.02% Pacific Islander, 1.03% from other races, and 1.18% from two or more races. Hispanic or Latino of any race were 1.96% of the population.

There were 2,184 households, out of which 30.9% had children under the age of 18 living with them, 54.8% were married couples living together, 12.0% had a female householder with no husband present, and 29.9% were non-families. 25.1% of all households were made up of individuals, and 8.1% had someone living alone who was 65 years of age or older. The average household size was 2.44 and the average family size was 2.90.

In the CDP, the population was spread out, with 24.6% under the age of 18, 7.9% from 18 to 24, 29.6% from 25 to 44, 23.5% from 45 to 64, and 14.4% who were 65 years of age or older. The median age was 38 years. For every 100 females, there were 94.2 males. For every 100 females age 18 and over, there were 90.0 males.

The median income for a household in the CDP was $36,490, and the median income for a family was $45,410. Males had a median income of $31,021 versus $21,859 for females. The per capita income for the CDP was $18,635. About 9.6% of families and 13.5% of the population were below the poverty line, including 22.9% of those under age 18 and 11.2% of those age 65 or over.

References

Census-designated places in Craven County, North Carolina
Census-designated places in North Carolina
New Bern micropolitan area
Populated places in North Carolina established by African Americans